Charles Alfonso Kinder II (October 8, 1946 – May 3, 2019) was an American novelist.

Biography
Kinder was born October 8 in Montgomery, West Virginia to Charles Alfonso and Eileen Reba (Parsons) Kinder. He was educated at West Virginia University (BA, MA) and Stanford University (Stegner Fellowship). After teaching at Stanford and Waynesburg College, Kinder was a professor of English at the University of Pittsburgh, where he taught from 1980 until his retirement in 2014.

At Stanford, Kinder became close friends with fellow students Raymond Carver and Scott Turow, and Stegner alumnus Larry McMurtry. His relationship with Carver inspired his 2001 novel Honeymooners: A Cautionary Tale, which for nearly twenty years had vexed Kinder and had grown, uncontrollably, into a sprawling manuscript of over 3,000 pages. Kinder's struggle with this manuscript was local legend at the University of Pittsburgh. Michael Chabon, once an undergraduate student of Kinder's, used it as inspiration for the character Grady Tripp in the 1995 novel Wonder Boys.

Kinder was married to Diane Cecily Blackmer. He died May 4, 2019, in Key Largo, Florida.

Novels

 Snakehunter (New York: Alfred A. Knopf, 1973)
 The Silver Ghost (New York: Harcourt Brace, 1979)
 Honeymooners: A Cautionary Tale (New York: Farrar, Straus & Giroux, 2001)

Creative Nonfiction
 Last Mountain Dancer: Hard-Earned Lessons in Love, Loss, and Honky-Tonk Outlaw Life, (New York: Carroll & Graf, 2004)

Poetry
 Giant Night: The Secret Science of Angels and Aliens : The Poem as Memoir, Funerary Text, with Kitchen Sink (Pittsburgh: self-published, 2013)
 Imagination Hotel (Pittsburgh: Six Gallery Press, 2014)
 All That Yellow (Pittsburgh: Low Ghost Press, 2014)
 Hot Jewels (Pittsburgh: Six Gallery Press, 2017)

Sources
Contemporary Authors Online. The Gale Group, 2003. PEN (Permanent Entry Number):  0000150152.

References

External links

 Kinder remembrance page on Pitt English Department Web site

1946 births
20th-century American novelists
2019 deaths
People from Montgomery, West Virginia
Stanford University alumni
Stanford University faculty
University of Pittsburgh faculty
Waynesburg University faculty
West Virginia University alumni
Writers from Pittsburgh
Novelists from West Virginia
21st-century American novelists
American male novelists
20th-century American male writers
21st-century American male writers
Novelists from Pennsylvania
Stegner Fellows